The Arena das Dunas ("Dunes Arena") is a football stadium in Natal, Brazil. The arena can shelter 31,375 spectators, and was designed by sports architect Christopher Lee of Populous. The stadium hosted football matches for the 2014 FIFA World Cup held in Brazil.  During the tournament, it had a seating capacity of 42,000. It was built in place of the Machadão, which was demolished in 2011.

This project replaced an old project called "Estádio Estrela dos Reis Magos" that would have been located in the neighboring municipality of Parnamirim. In the new project, a shopping center and commercial buildings, hotels of international standard and an artificial lake around the stadium will be built.

The stadium is located by the Senador Salgado Filho Avenue (BR-101 highway), a multi-lane road already served by the Complexo Viário do Quarto Centenário (Fourth Centennial Complex road or Complexo Viário Senador Carlos Alberto de Sousa). The project was one of the most praised by inspectors from FIFA.

2014 FIFA World Cup

Brazil national football team

References

External links 

 Official website of Arena das Dunas
 FIFA World Cup Profile
 Arena Guide - Tourist Information

Football venues in Rio Grande do Norte
Sports venues completed in 2014
2014 FIFA World Cup stadiums
Arena das Dunas
Sports venues in Rio Grande do Norte
2014 establishments in Brazil